Natural Sciences Museum "Sabiha Kasimati" (in Albanian: Muzeu i Shkencave të Natyrës "Sabiha Kasimati") is a natural science museum in Tirana, Albania.

History

Established in 1948, the museum is affiliated with the University of Tirana and has branches in zoology, botany and geology.

On 8 March 2018, the museum was named after Sabiha Kasimati, first Albanian scientist to make major contributions to the study of freshwater fish. Kasimati was killed in February 1951 by the Communist regime, accused of being part of a group of 22 Albanian intellectuals who had detonated a bomb in the Russian embassy in Tirana. In 1991, all victims were rehabilitated by the new government and awarded posthumously by the Order of Honour of the State.

Collections
The museum is composed of seven pavilions that collect 3,000 items related to the rich Albanian biodiversity, including animals (mammals, birds, reptiles, amphibians, fish, insects and aquatic invertebrates) and plants. Invertebrates represent the largest number of faunal
specimens exhibited in the museum and kept in the
scientific storage area.
The rich collection of the Museumis due to its talented
researchers such as Sabiha Kasimati, Ilia Mitrushi,
Vasil Puzanov, Fotaq Lamani, Kastriot Misja, Idriz
Haxhiu, Vangjel Andoni, Lekë Gjiknu ri, Islam Zeko,
Andrian Vaso, Ferdinand Bego, Taulant Bino, Sajmir
Beqiraj, etc. In addition, museum curators and taxidermists such as Muhamet Shpati and Grigor Jorgo
contributed to collection preservation.

See also
 Sabiha Kasimati
 Science and technology in Albania
 University of Tirana
 Tourism in Albania

References

Museums in Tirana
Natural history museums